Béïque Legault Thuot (BLTA) is an architecture firm based in Montreal, Quebec, Canada. The firm is headed by three partners, Olivier Legault, Denis C. Blais and Cyr Beauchemin, with continued involvement from founding partners Gilles Thuot and Jacques Béïque.

History
The architecture firm was founded in 1970 by Jacques Béïque. In 1971, the firm designed Quebec's first condo project, "Le Cerisaie". In 1990, they participated in the city of Montreal's first public consultation.

Since then, BLTA has completed nearly 2 million square feet of office space over the past decade and built more than 5,000 residential units in the greater Montreal metropolitan area.

Major projects 
The following is a list of major projects designed by Béïque Legault Thuot:

Current
Roccabella Towers, Montreal
Icone Towers, Montreal
701 University, Montreal
Le Triomphe, Montreal

Past new construction
2011 – Cité Nature, Montreal
2007 – Le Crystal de la Montagne, Montreal
2004 – E-Commerce Place, Montreal
1992 – Maison Cuvillier-Ostel, Montreal
1990 – Domaine du parc Olympique II, Montreal

Past renovation/modification
2155 Rue Guy
Peel Centre
New Birks Building
Gordon Brown Building
École Charles-Bruneau
Banque du Peuple
Montreal Herald Building
Windsor Hotel
Beaudry (Montreal Metro)

References

External links
Official website

Architecture firms of Canada
Companies based in Montreal
1970 establishments in Quebec
Design companies established in 1970
Architects from Montreal